The Gidabal, also known as Kitabal and Githabul, are an indigenous Australian tribe of southern Queensland, who inhabited an area in south-east Queensland and north-east New South Wales, now within the Southern Downs, Tenterfield and Kyogle Local Government regions.

Language
The Githabul call their language Githabul - it is variety of the Condamine-Upper Clarence language, a dialect cluster of the wider Bundjalungic branch of Pama–Nyungan language family, though the Githabul dislike calling their language Bundjalung as a descriptor of their speech.

Country
He adds that it extended from Killarney to Urbenville, Woodenbong, Unumgar (Nganamgah), and Tooloom.  at Rathdowney and about Spicer Gap. Tindale placed its southern reaches near the vicinity of Tabulam and Drake.

Social organization
R. H. Mathews visited with the Githabul in 1898 and picked up the following information concerning their social divisions, which were fourfold.

History of contact

Native title
In September 1995 Githabul legal scholar Trevor Close, on behalf of his people, lodged a native title claim for 140,600 hectares in the Kyogle, Woodenbong and Tenterfield areas in northeast New South Wales and in Queensland, south of Rathdowney.

Alternative names
 Kidabal, Kidjabal, Kit(t)a-bool, Kittabool, Kitabool, Kitapul
 Gidabul, Gidjoobal
 Kuttibul
 Noowidal

Notes

Citations

Sources

Aboriginal peoples of Queensland